Arthur Barton may refer to:

 Arthur Barton (cricketer) (1874–1949), English cricketer
 Arthur W. Barton (1899–1976), headmaster, academic author and football referee
 Arthur Barton (bishop) (1881–1962), Church of Ireland clergyman and Archbishop of Dublin